Bernard Erhard (February 6, 1934 – November 1, 2000) was an American actor.

Career
Early in his career, Erhard worked as a music teacher at the University of Southwestern Louisiana (USL), and directed numerous theater productions there.

As a stage actor, he performed in the original 1975 production of David Mamet's American Buffalo in Chicago.

In cinema, he appeared in Walking the Edge (1985) and  Say Yes (1986), and played the lead villain, Munkar, in the low-budget classic B film Deathstalker (1983).

He served as the referee on the medieval-themed television game show Knights and Warriors, under the moniker LORD ("Lord Of the Rules and Discipline").

He also worked as a voice actor in many children's cartoons. Among his roles were Cy-Kill in Challenge of the GoBots, King Morpheus in Little Nemo: Adventures in Slumberland, Cryotek in Visionaries: Knights of the Magical Light and one of the wolves in Rover Dangerfield.

Filmography

References

External links

1934 births
2000 deaths
20th-century American male actors
20th-century American educators
American male voice actors
University of Louisiana at Lafayette faculty
American music educators